The 1974 Munich WCT was a men's tennis tournament played on indoor carpet courts in Munich, West Germany. The tournament was part of Red Group of the 1974 World Championship Tennis circuit. It was the second edition of the event and was held from 1 April through 7 April 1974. Frew McMillan won the singles title.

Finals

Singles
 Frew McMillan defeated  Niki Pilić 5–7, 7–6(7–4), 7–6(7–4)

Doubles
 Bob Hewitt /  Frew McMillan defeated  Pierre Barthès /  Ilie Năstase 6–2, 7–6

References

External links
 ITF tournament edition details

Munich WCT
Munich WCT